The Carnival of Cultures, also known as Ottawa's International Folkloric Festival, consists of cultural performances, featuring music, song and dance from around the world.  It is usually located at the Marion Dewar Plaza in Ottawa.  The festival started in 1992.

The 3 day event features over 400 artists featuring international folk arts in Ottawa.  The event has included Sri Lankan, Venezuela, Filipinos, New Zealand, Lebanese, Mexican, Chinese, Scottish, Caribbean, Japanese, Colombian, Egypt, Latino, Inuit, Polish, Russian, Lebanese, Greek, Odyssey Dance Troupe, Modern jazz, and Ukrainian.

This festival not only celebrates cultures from around the world. "Carnival of Cultures exists for the purpose of promoting the creativity and artistic expression of artists whose works give new meaning to the folk arts. Through the preservation and transformation of traditional creations, these artists contribute to the longevity of the folk arts, making them accessible to the general public", says festival director Tony Yazbek.
In 2010, due to debts, Carnival of Cultures accepted the offer of RBC Bluesfest and became CityFolk. This is one of the most popular festivals in Canada.

Carnival of the Cultures Berlin 
There is another "Carnival of the Cultures", which is larger and takes place in Berlin Germany, for more info, visit Karneval der Kulturen.

References

External links 
 Carnival of Cultures Ottawa Official Site
 Carnival of Cultures Berlin Berlin Official Site
 Carnival of Cultures Berlin – Photo Report, Urban Artcore, CC-licensed (2010)

Festivals in Ottawa
Folk festivals in Canada
Music festivals in Ottawa
Recurring events established in 1993
Festivals established in 1992